Qasar Younis is a Pakistani American entrepreneur and venture capitalist. He was the co-founder CEO of Talkbin (acquired by Google), and is the former COO of Y Combinator. He left Y Combinator in March 2017 to start Applied Intuition, a technology company that is building advanced softwares and infrastructure tools for self-driving vehicles.

Early life and education 
Younis was born on a farm in Pakistan, and emigrated to the United States in 1988. He grew up in the Detroit area. After graduating with an engineering degree from Kettering University, he went on to complete his MBA at Harvard Business School.

Career 
Younis started his career as an engineer at GM and then Bosch in Japan. After Harvard Business School he started Cameesa.com. In 2010, he moved to the San Francisco bay area to start his second startup TalkBin, a platform for customers to send messages to businesses. The company graduated from Y Combinator and was acquired by Google in 2011.

Y Combinator 
After the TalkBin acquisition, Younis continued advising other startups, particularly through Y Combinator. In early 2013, he became a part-time partner at YC. In early 2014, he became a partner at Y Combinator. In 2015 he was promoted to COO.

In his time at Y Combinator, he has helped start or create some of the most important initiatives inside the accelerator including raising $700m Continuity Fund, starting the software team, and creating Investor Day.

Applied Intuition 

In January 2017, Younis started a self driving car startup Applied Intuition, along with co-founder Peter Ludwig, an engineering graduate of the University of Michigan. Applied Intuition provides simulated testing services for autonomous vehicles.

References 

American chief executives
Businesspeople in information technology
Living people
Place of birth missing (living people)
Harvard Business School alumni
Y Combinator people
American chief operating officers
Kettering University alumni
American people of Pakistani descent
Year of birth missing (living people)